Paralamyctes is a genus of centipedes in the family Henicopidae. It was described by British zoologist Reginald Innes Pocock in 1901.

Species
There are 26 valid species:

 Paralamyctes asperulus Silvestri, 1904
 Paralamyctes bipartitus (Lawrence, 1960)
 Paralamyctes cammooensis Edgecombe, 2004
 Paralamyctes cassisi Edgecombe, 2001
 Paralamyctes chilensis (Gervaisin, in Walckenaer & Gervais, 1847)
 Paralamyctes ginini Edgecombe, 2004
 Paralamyctes grayi Edgecombe, 2001
 Paralamyctes halli (Archey, 1917)
 Paralamyctes harrisi Archey, 1922
 Paralamyctes hornerae Edgecombe, 2001
 Paralamyctes insularis (Haase, 1887)
 Paralamyctes levigatus Attems, 1928
 Paralamyctes mesibovi Edgecombe, 2001
 Paralamyctes monteithi Edgecombe, 2001
 Paralamyctes neverneverensis Edgecombe, 2001
 Paralamyctes newtoni (Silvestri, 1917)
 Paralamyctes prendinii Edgecombe, 2003
 Paralamyctes quadridens Lawrence, 1960
 Paralamyctes rahuensis Edgecombe, 2004
 Paralamyctes spenceri Pocock, 1901
 Paralamyctes subicolus Edgecombe, 2004
 Paralamyctes trailli (Archey, 1917)
 Paralamyctes tridens Lawrence, 1960
 Paralamyctes validus Archey, 1917
 Paralamyctes weberi Silvestri, 1904
 Paralamyctes wellingtonensis Edgecombe, 2003

References

 

 
 
Centipede genera
Animals described in 1901
Taxa named by R. I. Pocock